The 2022–23 season is the 129th season in the existence of Oxford United F. C. and the club's seventh consecutive season in League One. In addition to the league, they will also compete in the 2022–23 FA Cup, the 2022–23 EFL Cup and the 2022–23 EFL Trophy.

Transfers

In

Out

Loans in

Loans out

Pre-season and friendlies
Oxford United announced they would endure a pre-season training camp near Marbella in Spain. Six days later, the club confirmed their pre-season schedule with eight matches planned.

Competitions

Overall record

League One

League table

Results summary

Results by round

Matches

On 23 June, the league fixtures were announced.

FA Cup

The U's were drawn away to Woking in the first round, then at home to Exeter City in the second round and Arsenal in the third round.

EFL Cup

Oxford were drawn at home against Swansea City in the first round and to Crystal Palace in the second round.

EFL Trophy

On 20 June, the initial Group stage draw was made, grouping Oxford United with Leyton Orient and Sutton United. Three days later, Chelsea U21s joined Southern Group G.

Top scorers

References

Oxford United
Oxford United F.C. seasons